Pingasa serrativalvis is a moth of the family Geometridae first described by Claude Herbulot in 2000. It is found in Tanzania.

References

Moths described in 2000
Pseudoterpnini